Pampán is one of the twenty municipalities of the state of Trujillo, Venezuela. The municipality occupies an area of 431 km2 with a population of 47,549 inhabitants according to the 2011 census.

The municipality consists of the following 4 towns:
 Pampán
 Flor de Patria
 La Paz
 Santa Ana

References

Municipalities of Trujillo (state)